Angie Cheong Wai-yee is a Hong Kong-based Malaysian Chinese actress. She won the Miss Chinese Malaysia in 1992 and went to Hong Kong to compete for the Miss Chinese International in 1993. After that, she signed a contract with the Hong Kong television TVB and became an actress. In 2003, she was beaten by her boyfriend and was seriously injured. Cheong recently returned to Malaysia to film an episode of Super Trio Series. In 2013, Cheong returned to TVB to film Never Dance Alone after being persuaded by her good friend and executive producer of the serial drama, Eric Tsang.

Notable roles
Lee Choi Yiu/Ng Fong Gwai in A Kindred Spirit
Spider Spirit Si Si in Journey to the West
Ma Ding-dong in My Date with a Vampire
Shek Siu Yuk in Ultra Protection
Jenny Hui in Never Dance Alone
Spider Demon in Journey to the West (1998 TV series)

Filmography

Films
Once Upon a Time in Triad Society 2 (1996)
Mystery Files (1996)
Love Amoeba Style (1997)
L-O-V-E......Love (1997)
Love Cruise (1997)
Love & Sex of the Eastern Hollywood (1998)
Mr. Wai-Go (1998)
A True Mob Story (1998)
Raped by an Angel 3 (1998)
The Conman (1998)
Body Weapon (1999)
Homicidal Maniac (2000)
An Eye for an Eye (2000)
A Wicked Ghost II: The Fear (2000)
Love Me, Love My Money (2001)
Troublesome Night 12 (2001)
The Reporter (2003)
The Prince of Storm (2003)
The Runner (2004)
Men in a Blue Mood (2004)
Love Is a Many Stupid Thing (2004)
The Key to Destiny (2004)

Television series
 ICAC (1994)
 Class Of Distinction (1995)
 Detective Investigation Files (1995)
 A Kindred Spirit (1995–1999)
 Journey to the West (1996)
 Journey to the West II (1998)
 Dark Tales II (1998)
 Ultra Protection (1999)
 Happy Ever After (1999)
 Showbiz Tycoon (2002)
 My Date with a Vampire 2 (2001)
 The New Adventures of Chor Lau-heung (2001)
 Greed Mask (2003, broadcast in Hong Kong in 2006)
 Armed Reaction IV (2004)
 Never Dance Alone (2014)
 Deep in the Realm of Conscience (2018)
Guardian Angel 2018 Web Drama (2018) - Mak Chi-man/Ms. Mak (appears in episode 9–13) 
 I Bet Your Pardon (2019)
 The Gutter (2020)

External links
 

Hong Kong film actresses
Malaysian television actresses
TVB actors
Living people
Malaysian people of Chinese descent
People from Ipoh
People from Perak
Malaysian beauty pageant winners
Malaysian film actresses
Hong Kong television actresses
20th-century Hong Kong actresses
21st-century Hong Kong actresses
Year of birth missing (living people)
Malaysian born Hong Kong artists